Edward Owens (7 November 1913 – 1980), often known as Tussy Owens, was a footballer who played in the Football League for Preston North End and Crystal Palace as a defender. He also played in non-league football for Bath City.

Playing career
Born in Trimdon Grange, Owens began his career at Trimdon St Mary's. In 1928, he went on trial at Northampton Town, and in 1929 joined Stockport County, but did not make a League appearance.

In 1930, he joined Preston North End, where he scored seven goals in 19 appearances, and in January 1934 signed for Crystal Palace of the Third Division South. Between then and when regular league competition was suspended due to World War II, he made 164 league appearances for Palace without scoring. In all senior competitions, he made 172 appearances for the club, scoring once.

In the 1939–40 season of wartime regional football, Owens continued to appear for Palace, making a total of 42 appearances in all competitions scoring once. He returned to Stockport County and made 11 appearances in the Football League North in 1944–45. In November 1945, he moved on to Bath City.

References

External links
Ted Owens at holmesdale.net

1913 births
1980 deaths
People from Trimdon Grange
Footballers from County Durham
English footballers
English Football League players
Association football defenders
Stockport County F.C. players
Preston North End F.C. players
Crystal Palace F.C. players
Bath City F.C. players